Dactylosporangium luridum is a bacterium from the genus Dactylosporangium which has been isolated from soil from a hay meadow from the Cockle Park Experimental Farm, Northumberland, England.

References

 

Micromonosporaceae
Bacteria described in 2010